Oakport Township is a township in Clay County, Minnesota, United States. The population was 1,689 at the 2000 census.

History
In 1990, Oakport Township reached an orderly annexation agreement whereby developed portions of the Township (Tract 2) entered the city of Moorhead on January 1, 2015.

Geography
According to the United States Census Bureau, the township has a total area of 29.2 square miles (75.5 km), all land.

Demographics
As of the census of 2000, there were 1,689 people, 572 households, and 498 families residing in the township. There were 589 housing units at an average density of 20.2/sq mi (7.8/km). The racial makeup of the township was 97.99% White, 0.36% African American, 0.36% Native American, 0.06% Asian, 0.12% from other races, and 1.12% from two or more races. Hispanic or Latino of any race were 0.71% of the population.

There were 572 households, out of which 43.4% had children under the age of 18 living with them, 80.4% were married couples living together, 4.4% had a female householder with no husband present, and 12.9% were non-families. 11.5% of all households were made up of individuals, and 4.4% had someone living alone who was 65 years of age or older. The average household size was 2.93 and the average family size was 3.13.

In the township the population was spread out, with 30.0% under the age of 18, 5.9% from 18 to 24, 30.4% from 25 to 44, 24.7% from 45 to 64, and 9.1% who were 65 years of age or older. The median age was 38 years. For every 100 females, there were 107.2 males. For every 100 females age 18 and over, there were 102.6 males.

The median income for a household in the township was $60,400, and the median income for a family was $62,794. Males had a median income of $41,856 versus $26,842 for females. The per capita income for the township was $21,570. About 2.8% of families and 4.5% of the population were below the poverty line, including 4.9% of those under age 18 and 7.0% of those age 65 or over.

References

Townships in Clay County, Minnesota
Townships in Minnesota